Saint Basil Academy was a private, Ukrainian Catholic, all-girls high school in Jenkintown, Pennsylvania.  It is located in the Ukrainian Catholic Archeparchy of Philadelphia and also within the Archdiocese of Philadelphia. Saint Basil Academy was established in 1931 by the Sisters of Saint Basil.  On October 8, 2020, Saint Basil Academy announced that it will close its doors at the end of the 2020-2021 school year.  The last class graduated on June 3, 2021.

History
In the early part of the 20th century, the Sisters of Saint Basil came to the United States. In 1911, the Sisters came to Philadelphia at the invitation of His Excellency, the Most Reverend Soter Ortynsky, OSBM, who was the first Ukrainian Catholic Ordinary in America.

For the first few decades, the Sisters expanded their talents to the education of grade school children in the orphanage and parishes, but during these years, they did not forget the idea of a Catholic high school for girls. Saint Basil Academy, a convent boarding school for girls, began on July 19, 1931 in the classrooms of the newly constructed convent building dedicated only a day earlier.

Space and limited facilities on the main campus could no longer provide for updated laboratory and library expansion during the oncoming years. In 1968, the administration of the Sisters of Saint Basil the Great, undertook the construction of a new building, capable of housing 400 students.

Program of study
Saint Basil Academy offers academic subjects with an emphasis on preparation for higher learning. Some of the courses are business-oriented and teach skills to those students who are interested in the business and computer fields. Electives are also offered in the fine arts.

Course offerings

Art
 Art Appreciation
 Art I
 Art II
 Art III

Business
 Keyboarding with Computer Applications
 Accounting I
 Accounting II
 Business Communication
 Applied Economics
 Desktop Publishing

English Department
 Honors English I
 English I
 Honors English II
 English II
 Honors American Literature (Honors English III)
 American Literature (English III)
 Advanced Placement English
 British Literature (English IV)
 Literary Genres
 Journalism
 Creative Writing

Language Department
 French
 French I
 French II
 French III
 French IV
 Advanced Placement French Language
 Latin
 Our Classical Roots
 Latin I
 Latin II
 Latin III
 Latin IV
 Spanish
 Spanish I
 Spanish II
 Spanish III
 Spanish IV
 AP Spanish Literature
 Ukrainian
 Introduction to Ukrainian
 Ukrainian I
 Ukrainian II
 Ukrainian III
 Ukrainian IV

Music Department
 Classical Piano
 Piano Class for Madrigals
 Guitar I
 Instrumental Ensemble
 Madrigals
 Theory I
 Theory II
 Choral Music
 Music Appreciation
 American Music
 AP Music Theory
 Glee Club
 Ukrainian Singers
 Handbells

Health and Physical Education Department
 Phys. Ed I
 Phys. Ed II
 Phys. Ed III
 Phys. Ed. IV
 Health

Science Department
 Geological and Atmospheric Science
 Honors Biology
 Biology
 Honors Chemistry
 Chemistry
 Environmental Science
 Human Anatomy and Physiology
 Honors Physics
 General Physics

Religious Studies Department
 Religion I - The Christian Faith
 Religion II - Jesus the Christ
 Religion II - Prayer & Sacraments
 Religion III - The Church
 Christian Morality
 Religion IV - Hebrew Scripture
 Religion IV - Love & Relationships
 Death and Dying
 Peace Through Justice
 Dating and Sexuality

Social Studies Department
 World Cultures
 Honors Modern European History
 United States History
 Advanced Placement United States History
 United States Government
 Practical Law
 AP United States Government and Politics
 Psychology and Sociology
History in Film
Culture, Race, and Ethnicity in America

List of principals 
 Sr. Carla Hernández, OSBM (1986–2012)
 Gwenda Coté (2012–2017)
Connie D'Angelo (2017—2021)

References

External links
 

Catholic secondary schools in Pennsylvania
Educational institutions established in 1931
Jenkintown, Pennsylvania
1931 establishments in Pennsylvania
Girls' schools in Pennsylvania
Schools in Montgomery County, Pennsylvania
Ukrainian-American culture in Pennsylvania
Ukrainian-American culture in Philadelphia